Bruna Wurts (born 19 August 2000) is a Brazilian artistic roller skater.

Wurts competed at the 2018 South American Games, where she won a gold medal, and at the 2019 Pan American Games where she won a gold medal in the free skating event.

References

2000 births
Living people
Brazilian artistic roller skaters
Female roller skaters
Argentine sportswomen
Roller figure skaters at the 2019 Pan American Games
Pan American Games gold medalists for Brazil
Pan American Games medalists in roller skating
Competitors at the 2018 South American Games
Medalists at the 2019 Pan American Games
21st-century Brazilian women
South American Games gold medalists for Brazil
South American Games medalists in roller sports